Johannes Lambertus Adriana van de Snepscheut (12 September 195323 February 1994) was a computer scientist and educator.  He was a student of Martin Rem and Edsger Dijkstra.  At the time of his death he was the executive officer of the computer science department at the California Institute of Technology.  He was also developing an editor for proving theorems called "Proxac". 

In the early morning hours of February 23, 1994, van de Snepscheut attacked his sleeping wife, Terre, with an axe.  He then set their house on fire, and died as it burned around him.  Terre and their three children escaped their burning home.

Bibliography
 Jan L. A. Van De Snepscheut, Gerrit A. Slavenburg, Introducing the notion of processes to hardware, ACM SIGARCH Computer Architecture News, April 1979.
 Jan L. A. Van De Snepscheut, Trace Theory and VLSI Design,, Lecture Notes in Computer Science, Volume 200, Springer, 1985.
 Jan L. A. Van De Snepscheut, What computing is all about. Springer, 1993.

References

External links
 
 Article based on the back story to these events

1953 births
1994 deaths
Van De Snepscheut, Jan L. A.
Dutch computer scientists
Eindhoven University of Technology alumni
People from Oosterhout
Software engineering researchers
Academic staff of the University of Groningen
People from La Cañada Flintridge, California